Diamond Safari may refer to:

 Diamond Safari (1958 film), an American film
 Diamond Safari (1966 film), a French film